The Anne River is a small river in Canterbury, New Zealand. It rises near the Anne Saddle and flows east then north for approximately  until it meets the Henry River, itself a tributary of the Waiau Uwha River. The St James Walkway, a popular tramping track, follows the Anne River for its entire length, and the Anne Huts are located near the river's mouth.

Location
  — Head
  — Mouth

See also

List of rivers of New Zealand

References
Land Information New Zealand - Search for Place Names

Rivers of Canterbury, New Zealand
Rivers of New Zealand